Freshness may refer to:
 Post harvest freshness
 Freshness (album), a 1995 album by Casiopea
 Freshness (cryptography), certainty that replayed messages in a replay attack on a protocol will be detected as such

See also
Fresh (disambiguation)